Pipraich is a town and a nagar panchayat in Gorakhpur district in the Indian state of Uttar Pradesh. The Pipraich block comes under the tehsil Sadar. It was declared a town on 25 November 1871, under the Bengal Chaukidari Act, of 1856 and is now administered as a town area under the U.P. Town Areas Act of 1914.

History
It was declared a town on 25 November 1871, under the Bengal Chaukidari Act, of 1856 and is now administered as a town area under the U.P. Town Areas Act of 1914. The Town covers an area of 2.8 km2. and had a population of 7,162 in 1971. The town area committee consists of 11 members including the chairman, all elected by its inhabitants for a term of four years. This period can, however, be extended by government in special cases.

The total income and expenditure of the committee was Rs 90,422 and Rs 1,05,710 respectively in 1973-74.
The town has its own waterworks, commissioned in 1971. There were 129 water taps with 2,438 m of pipelines in 1971. Electricity became available for street lighting in the town in 1962. There were 40 electric street lamps in 1972–73. The committee also makes arrangements for the cleansing of roads, streets and drains in the town.

Geography
It has an average elevation of 71 metres (232 feet).
It is located 20 km north-east of Gorakhpur city. The Gorakhpur airport is located at distance of 15 km from Pipraich town.

Demographics
 India census, Pipraich (Town) had a population of 1,25,762. Males constitute 52% of the population and females 48%. Pipraich has an average literacy rate of 61%, higher than the national average of 59.5%: male literacy is 70%, and female literacy is 51%. In Pipraich, 15% of the population is under 6 years of age.

Police and administration
The Pipraich block have its own police station. The Development Block Pipraich was inaugurated on 1 April 1960.
The Pipraich block is under Lok Sabha Kshetra 38- Gorakhpur and Vidhan Sabha Kshetra 321- Pipraich.

Political representation

UP state election 2007

Transport
Pipraich is well connected by rail and road. The Pipraich railway station is located north east of Gorakhpur. It comes under the North Eastern Railway zone. The Pipraich railway station code is PPC.

References

Cities and towns in Gorakhpur district